The 2013 FIBA Europe Under-16 Championship for Women is the 25th edition of the FIBA Europe Under-16 Championship for Women. 16 teams feature in the competition, held in Varna and Albena, Bulgaria from 1 to 11 August 2013.

Participating teams

  (Runners-up, 2012 FIBA Europe Under-16 Championship for Women Division B)

  (3rd place, 2012 FIBA Europe Under-16 Championship for Women Division B)
  (Winners, 2012 FIBA Europe Under-16 Championship for Women Division B)

First round
The first-round groups draw took place on 8 December 2012 in Freising, Germany. In the first round, the sixteen teams were allocated in four groups of four teams each. The top three teams of each group will qualify for the Second Round. The last team of each group will play in the Classification Group G first, then in the 9th–16th place playoffs.

Group A

|}

Group B

|}

Group C

|}

Group D

|}

Second round
Twelve advancing teams from the First Round will be allocated in two groups of six teams each. The top four teams of each group will advance to the quarterfinals. The last two teams of each group will play for the 9th–16th place against the teams from the Group G.

Group E

|}

Group F

|}

Classification Group G
The last team of each group of the First Round will compete in this Classification Round.

|}

9th – 16th Place Playoff

Classification games for 13th – 16th place

Classification games for 9th – 12th place

1st – 8th Place Playoff

Quarterfinals

Classification games for 5th – 8th place

Semifinals

Final classification games

Match for 15th place

Match for 13th place

Match for 11th place

Match for 9th place

Match for 7th place

Match for 5th place

Bronze medal match

Final

Final standings

All-Tournament Team 
  Ángela Salvadores
  Debora Dubei
  Francesca Pan
  Julia Reisingerova
  Maria Vadeeva

References

External links
Official Site

2013
2013–14 in European women's basketball
2013–14 in Bulgarian basketball
International youth basketball competitions hosted by Bulgaria
International women's basketball competitions hosted by Bulgaria
2013 in youth sport
Sport in Varna, Bulgaria